John Bishop House is a historic home located in Exeter Township, Berks County, Pennsylvania.   It is a colonial Georgian dwelling in the Palladian style. It was built about 1770, and is a -story stone dwelling with a gable roof and two-story addition.  It features a cut stone facade, Georgian entryway, and open staircase rising three stories.

It was listed on the National Register of Historic Places in 1985.

References

Houses completed in 1770
Houses on the National Register of Historic Places in Pennsylvania
Georgian architecture in Pennsylvania
Houses in Berks County, Pennsylvania
National Register of Historic Places in Berks County, Pennsylvania
1770 establishments in Pennsylvania